Károly Eperjes (born 17 February 1954 in Hegykő) is a Kossuth Prize winner Hungarian stage and film actor, member of the National Theatre in Budapest. Eperjes appeared in more than fifty films since 1982.

Selected filmography

Awards
 Jászai Mari Prize (1986)
 Kossuth Prize (1999)
 Honorary Citizen of Budapest (2011)
  Order of Merit of Hungary – Officer's Cross (2017)

References

External links
 

1954 births
Living people
Hungarian male film actors
Hungarian male stage actors
People from Győr-Moson-Sopron County
Members of the National Assembly of Hungary (1994–1998)